The Phoenix Festival was set up by John Vincent Power of the Mean Fiddler Music Group in 1993 as an alternative to the established Glastonbury and Reading Festivals. It was held at Long Marston Airfield near Stratford-upon-Avon and was one of the first four-day festivals in Britain.

History
The first year of the festival (1993) featured headline performances by Sonic Youth, Hole, Faith No More and The Black Crowes, and included other notable acts such as Manic Street Preachers, Julian Cope, The Young Gods and House of Pain. However, the event was marred by controversy. Travelers and refused free entry, blocked the entrance meaning many spent their Friday night in their vehicles in long queues.  Festival goers were made to put out camp fires and turn off sound systems at midnight. These rules were in contrast to the 24-hour culture of the Glastonbury Festival, with which many of those present at Phoenix were familiar. There were even demands for refunds, and the festival's reputation was marred from the outset. The enforcement of these rules by security staff led to many of the festival goers showing their displeasure in no uncertain terms.
Fencing and light rigs were toppled, fires set and physical clashes between festival goers and security staff also occurred.

The festival never really recovered from its poor reception, and although it attracted consistently popular acts, festival goers were less than happy with the site (an old airstrip) and there were also complaints about the prices on site. Such were the problems with security that when the Big Top managed by experimental theatre company 'Dancin Dog' was three times over capacity no staff were available to remedy the situation leading to fights between performers and audience and artists unable to leave the stage resulting in crowds demanding more for several hours and performers continuing until they collapsed from exhaustion and in fear for their lives.

Problems with the event reached a climax in 1996 when many festival goers missed David Bowie on the Thursday night due to problems letting people on site. Having sold out that year for the first time, due to the Glastonbury Festival taking its usual year off (once in every five years in a cycle), the organisers struggled to cope with the crowds and extreme heat. Temperatures on site exceeded thirty degrees Celsius on all days. The weekend was further marred with problems with water being unavailable in parts of the site. The event was notable for the fact that the Sex Pistols headlined their first major UK festival on that weekend.

The festival continued for one more year but could never compete with its main rival, the Glastonbury Festival. The 1998 Phoenix event was cancelled due to poor ticket sales, but some acts were moved to that year's Reading Festival.

In July 2011, Vince Power announced his intention to resurrect the festival in his introduction to the programme of the Hop Farm Festival. Power wrote: "For those of you who remember the Phoenix Festival, it's my intention to resurrect this festival next year as Glastonbury is taking a break."

Line ups

1993
The 1993 Phoenix was held from 16 to 18 July at Long Marston, Stratford-Upon-Avon.

1994
The 1994 Phoenix was held from 14 to 17 July at Long Marston, Stratford-Upon-Avon.

1995
The 1995 Phoenix was held from 13 to 16 July at Long Marston, Stratford-Upon-Avon.

1996
The 1996 Phoenix Festival was held from 18 to 21 July at Long Marston, Stratford-Upon-Avon.

1997
The 1997 Phoenix Festival was held from 17 to 20 July at Long Marston, Stratford-Upon-Avon. "David Bowie requested some odd items on his Phoenix rider but came close to not getting a few," recalled promoter Neil Pengelly. "An urgent, eleventh-hour delivery of his bullworker and carrot juicer required a dash through the arena in a golf cart – not a problem until a plucky punter nicked the cart from under the nose of the briefly distracted driver. A Benny Hill-style chase ended when the man dumped the cart and ran off into the crowd. Adding insult to injury, three girls spotted the key still in the cart and ram-raided the cigarette stall."

References

External links
Phoenix Festival 96 fansite

Music festivals in Warwickshire
Music festivals established in 1993
Rock festivals in the United Kingdom